Jeannette Marianne Lewin (born 27 February 1972 in Vianen, South Holland) is a former field hockey midfield player from the Netherlands, who played a total number of 114 international matches for the Dutch National Women's Team, in which she scored twelve goals.

She made her début on 14 December 1990 in a friendly against England (3-1), and won the bronze medal with Holland at the 1996 Summer Olympics. Lewin retired after having won the silver medal at the 1998 Women's Hockey World Cup in Utrecht. She later married former Dutch field hockey international Leo Klein Gebbink.

References
 Dutch Hockey Federation

External links
 

1972 births
Field hockey players at the 1992 Summer Olympics
Field hockey players at the 1996 Summer Olympics
Dutch female field hockey players
Living people
Olympic field hockey players of the Netherlands
Olympic bronze medalists for the Netherlands
People from Vianen
Olympic medalists in field hockey
Medalists at the 1996 Summer Olympics
SV Kampong players
Sportspeople from Utrecht (province)
20th-century Dutch women
21st-century Dutch women